Jordan Bulpitt (born 19 April 1998) is an English cricketer. He made his first-class debut on 7 April 2018 for Cambridge MCCU against Essex as part of the Marylebone Cricket Club University fixtures. He made his List A debut on 27 July 2021, for Warwickshire in the 2021 Royal London One-Day Cup.

References

External links
 

1998 births
Living people
Sportspeople from Stafford
English cricketers
Cambridge MCCU cricketers
Warwickshire cricketers
Staffordshire cricketers
English cricketers of the 21st century
Alumni of Anglia Ruskin University